The 2018 Bali gubernatorial election took place on 27 June 2018 as part of the simultaneous local elections. It was held to elect the governor of Bali along with their deputy, whilst members of the provincial council (Dewan Perwakilan Rakyat Daerah) will be re-elected in 2019.

Incumbent I Made Mangku Pastika was barred from participating in the re-elections after having served two full terms. Contesting the election were Denpasar mayor Ida Bagus Rai Dharmawijaya Mantra and People's Representative Council member I Wayan Koster.

Timeline
Registration for party-backed candidates were opened between 8 and 10 January 2018, while independent candidates were required to register between 22 and 26 November 2017. The numerical order of the candidates were determined on 13 February through a lottery. The campaigning period would commence between 15 February and 24 June, with a three-day election silence before voting on 27 June.

Up until the registration deadline, no independent candidates registered to contest the election. On 23 April, the regional KPU declared that there will be 2,982,201 eligible voters across the province.

Candidates

PDI-P chairman Megawati Soekarnoputri announced third-term People's Representative Council member I Wayan Koster as the party's candidate for the elections on 11 November 2017. He was part of the 10th commission, which covers education, sports, tourism and creative economy. In the same announcement, former regent of Gianyar Tjokorda Oka Artha Ardana Sukawati (Cok Ace) was endorsed by PDI-P as his running mate. Soon afterwards, the National Mandate Party endorsed him as well. Other parties supporting him are the National Mandate Party, Hanura, and the Indonesian Justice and Unity Party.

Ida Bagus Rai Dharmawijaya Mantra (Rai Mantra) initially attempted to register at PDI-P which had supported him in the 2015 Denpasar mayoral elections. However, Golkar, whose cadre I Ketut Sudikerta was already the sitting vice-governor, decided to place its support behind the mayor attaching Sudikerta as his running mate after Nasdem and Gerindra endorsed Rai Mantra. The Democratic Party also endorsed him.

Issues
I Wayan Koster stated that he would like to see a reform on Indonesia's family planning program which recommends two children per family, saying that it defied Balinese traditions which ideally has four children. Rai Mantra stated that if elected, he would consistently oppose the reclamation program in Benoa Bay.

References

Elections in Bali
2018 Indonesian gubernatorial elections